Junglinster is a commune in central  Luxembourg, which draws its name from its principal town, Junglinster. It is one of six communes in the Luxembourg canton of Grevenmacher. The 18th-century St Martin's church is a national monument.

History
The oldest mention of Lincera (the "linster" part of the place name) is in documents going back to 983, with the status of parish first attested in 1128.

Population
, the town of Junglinster has a population of 3,254, whilst the wider commune of Junglinster has a population of 7,621. Figures from the same year report that 64.11% of the population of the commune holds Luxembourgish nationality, with the five largest immigrant populations in the commune being those of Portuguese (7.77%), French (5.12%), German (3.88%), Belgian (3.27%) and British (1.91%) nationalities.

Transmitters
The commune hosts two of the world's most powerful longwave transmitters, with the older transmitter based just north of the town of Junglinster since 1933, and a more powerful longwave transmitter located in Beidweiller since 1972. These transmitters were utilised by Radio Luxembourg, which gained iconic status amongst audiences in Britain and Ireland in the 1930s and again in the 1960s and 1970s, for popular programmes that circumvented restrictive broadcasting laws, particularly in the UK. This gave Junglinster an important role in the history of pirate radio. The transmitters are in still in use by RTL (French radio).

Populated places
The commune consists of the following towns and villages:

 Junglinster Section:
 Altlinster
 
 Bourglinster
 Eisenborn
 Godbrange
 Graulinster
 Imbringen
 Junglinster (seat)
 Behlen
 Jeanharis

 Rodenbourg Section:
 Beidweiler
 Eschweiler
 Gonderange
 Rodenbourg

Notable people 
Lex Jacoby, writer (winner of the Servais Prize), born in Junglister

Twin towns – sister cities

Junglinster is twinned with:
 Üdersdorf, Germany
 La Crosse, United States

References

External links
 
  Commune of Junglinster official website

 
Communes in Grevenmacher (canton)
Towns in Luxembourg